John M. "Jack" Keane (born February 1, 1943) is a retired American four-star general, a former Vice Chief of Staff of the United States Army, and a recipient of the Presidential Medal of Freedom. He is a national security analyst, primarily on Fox News, and serves as chairman of the Institute for the Study of War and as chairman of AM General.

Early life and education
Keane was born in Manhattan, New York, the son of Elizabeth (Davis) and John Keane. He has a brother, Ronald.

Keane attended Bishop Dubois High School and Fordham University, where he participated in the Pershing Rifles. He graduated with a B.S. degree in accounting in 1966. He then attended Western Kentucky University and graduated with an M.A. degree in philosophy. He later graduated from the US Army Command and General Staff College and the US Army War College.

Military career

Keane served in the Vietnam War as a Ranger paratrooper, leading in combat as a platoon leader and company commander. He obtained the Combat Infantry Badge and the Master Parachutist Badge. He later served in U.S. engagements in Somalia, Haiti, Bosnia, and Kosovo. His commands include the 1st Brigade, 10th Mountain Division, 101st Airborne Division, and the XVIII Airborne Corps.

In 1991 Keane saved the life of David Petraeus during a live-fire exercise. According to Keane, Petraeus was shot "accidentally, standing right next to me, and I had to fight to save his life. He had a hole about the size of a quarter in his back and is gushing with blood, and we stopped the bleeding and got him on a helicopter and got him to a surgeon and so we were sort of bonded ever since that time."

Keane retired from military service in 2003.

Later career

 
After his retirement, he has served as an informal advisor to presidents and other senior officials. He served an advisory role in the management of the US occupation of Iraq, as a member of the Defense Policy Board Advisory Committee. In January 2007, Keane and the scholar Frederick W. Kagan released a policy paper, "Choosing Victory: A Plan for Success in Iraq," through the American Enterprise Institute that called for bringing security by putting 30,000 additional American troops there for at least 18 months. In part convinced by this paper, President George W. Bush ordered on January 10, 2007, the deployment of 21,500 additional troops to Iraq, most of whom would be deployed to Baghdad. The deployment has been nicknamed the 2007 "surge."

Of his initial meeting with President Bush regarding the surge, Keane said thar he made a phone call to Newt Gingrich to ask his advice prior to the meeting. As Keane said in 2014, 

Keane was asked by Vice President Cheney to go back on active duty and to lead the surge in the field. When Keane declined, Cheney pressed him to come work in the White House and oversee both the wars in Afghanistan and Iraq; Keane again declined. Keane ended up briefly working at the White House and then later traveled to Iraq several times to advise General Petraeus.

Current activities
Keane is a regular contributor to Fox News and is involved in a variety of business, think tank and charitable activities. He serves as chairman of AM General, the firm that produces the Humvee. In June 2016, Keane co-founded IP3 International (IP3), a nuclear energy consulting firm.

Keane is an advisor to the Spirit of America, a 501(c)(3) organization. He formerly served as a strategic advisor for Academi and is a former director of defense giant General Dynamics.

In November 2016, shortly after Stanley A. McChrystal declined the post of Secretary of Defense, Keane was offered an appointment to the post, but he declined, citing the death of his wife several months earlier. After Defense Secretary Jim Mattis resigned in December 2018, Trump again offered the job to Keane, who again declined.

Keane is considered an influential voice to leaders from both major political parties, including Donald Trump, particularly on foreign policy issues related to the Middle East.

IP3
Keane is a cofounder and director of IP3 International.
According to a staff report to the chairman of the House Oversight Committee, during the 2016 US presidential campaign of Donald Trump and subsequently, Trump aides such as Jared Kushner and others have been engaged in promoting IP3's plan to transfer nuclear technology from the US to Saudi Arabia. According to the report, IP3 founders and others have been seeking to broker a deal with Riyadh without the "gold standard," a provision—tied to Section 123 of the 1954 Atomic Energy Act, which establishes conditions for nuclear cooperation between the US and its allies, that seeks to limit weaponizing of nuclear energy.
In July 2019, the committee chairman released a second staff report that detailed various activities and contacts between IP3 and the Trump administration.
 A letter to Saudi Crown Prince Mohammed bin Salman (MBS) that was signed by General Keane and executives of IP3, boasted, “The agreements by President Trump and Mohammed bin Salman have established the framework for our unique opportunity to take the next steps with IP3 and the Kingdom of Saudi Arabia."

Personal life 
Keane married his first wife, Theresa Doyle, in 1965, and has two sons. She died in 2016 after having Parkinson's disease for 14 years. He is married to Angela McGlowan.

Awards and decorations
Military awards that Keane has received include two Defense Distinguished Service Medals, two Army Distinguished Service Medals, the Silver Star, five Legion of Merits, the Bronze Star Medal, three Meritorious Service Medals, one Army Commendation Medal, the Joint Chiefs Service Badge, the Humanitarian Service Medal, Ranger Tab, the Combat Infantryman Badge, the Master Parachutist Badge, and the Air Assault Badge.

President Donald Trump awarded Keane the Presidential Medal of Freedom on March 10, 2020.

Keane's civilian awards include the Fordham University Distinguished Alumni Award, the USO 2002 Man of the Year award, and the Association of the United States Army 2001 Man of the Year award. Keane was furthermore awarded an honorary Ph.D. degree in Law from Fordham University and an honorary Ph.D. degree in Public Service from Eastern Kentucky University.

References

External links

1943 births
Center for Strategic and Budgetary Assessments
Fordham University alumni
Living people
People from Manhattan
Pershing Riflemen
Recipients of the Defense Distinguished Service Medal
Recipients of the Distinguished Service Medal (US Army)
Recipients of the Legion of Merit
Recipients of the Silver Star
United States Army Command and General Staff College alumni
United States Army generals
United States Army Vice Chiefs of Staff
United States Army War College alumni
Western Kentucky University alumni